Beautiful Sky is the third studio album by the German band Reamonn. It was recorded in Spain and released on 23 May 2003. The album reached number 3 on the German Albums Chart, and was certified Platinum in Germany.

To promote the album, the band toured with Robbie Williams in Switzerland, Austria, Portugal, Estonia, Latvia and Lithuania.

Track listing

Charts

Weekly charts

Year-end charts

Certifications

References 

2003 albums
Reamonn albums